Neston railway station serves the town of Neston, Cheshire, England. It is the southernmost station on the English part of the Borderlands Line before it reaches Wales. The station is 8¾ miles (14 km) south of Bidston.

History

There was once a substantial station building on the Bidston bound platform. This fell into disrepair in the late 1990s though, and was finally demolished when the station was modernised for Disability Discrimination Act compliancy in 2003.

Future

Long standing plans to electrify the Borderlands Line have been put on hold due to the prohibitive cost of installing third rail electrification. This has led Merseytravel to look at other options for the line, including the possibility of overhead lines.

Facilities

The station is unstaffed and only 'bus shelter' type structures offer passengers any protection from the elements. Bus interchange is available from the stop on Ladies Walk adjacent the Bidston bound platform. This is also from where rail replacement services leave. The station has a small car park next to the Wrexham bound platform and a larger car park on the opposite side of the line, both owned and operated by the local council.

Services

The station is served by an hourly service on weekdays (two-hourly in the evening and on bank holidays) southbound to Wrexham Central and northbound to Bidston for connections to Liverpool via the Wirral Line. Services are provided by Transport for Wales' fleet of Class 150 diesel multiple units.

On Sundays there are departures approximately every 90 minutes in each direction.

References

Bibliography

External links

Railway stations in Cheshire
DfT Category F2 stations
Former Great Central Railway stations
Railway stations in Great Britain opened in 1896
Railway stations served by Transport for Wales Rail
Neston